The Wolf summation is a method for computing the electrostatic interactions of systems (e.g. crystals). This method is generally more computationally efficient than the Ewald summation. It was proposed by Dieter Wolf.

References

See also
 Wolf method on SklogWiki

Potential theory
Computational physics